
Gmina Biała Rawska is an urban-rural gmina (administrative district) in Rawa County, Łódź Voivodeship, in central Poland.

Villages
Apart from the town of Biała Rawska, Gmina Biała Rawska contains the villages and settlements of Aleksandrów, Antoninów, Babsk, Biała Wieś, Białogórne, Błażejewice, Bronisławów, Byki, Chodnów, Chrząszczew, Chrząszczewek, Dańków, Franklin, Franopol, Galiny, Gołyń, Gośliny, Grzymkowice, Janów, Jelitów, Józefów, Konstantynów, Koprzywna, Krukówka, Lesiew, Marchaty, Marianów, Narty, Niemirowice, Orla Góra, Ossa, Pachy, Pągów, Podlesie, Podsędkowice, Porady Górne, Przyłuski, Rokszyce, Rosławowice, Rzeczków, Słupce, Stanisławów, Stara Wieś, Studzianek, Szczuki, Szwejki Małe, Teodozjów, Teresin, Tuniki, Wilcze Piętki, Wola-Chojnata, Wólka Babska, Wólka Lesiewska, Zakrzew, Zofianów, Zofiów, Żurawia and Żurawka.

Neighbouring gminas
Gmina Biała Rawska is bordered by the town of Rawa Mazowiecka and by the gminas of Błędów, Głuchów, Kowiesy, Mszczonów, Nowy Kawęczyn, Rawa Mazowiecka, Regnów and Sadkowice.

References
Polish official population figures 2006

Biala Rawska
Rawa County